Precious Memories is the thirteenth studio album and the first gospel album by American country music artist Alan Jackson. It was released on February 28, 2006 on the Arista Nashville label. This project began at The Rukkus Room Recording Studios when Alan Jackson recorded a song for his Father-In-Law’s funeral. This recording lead to what is now the Precious Memories album. Unlike his previous albums, this is a side project composed of traditional gospel songs. Although no singles were released from it, Precious Memories earned a Platinum certification by the Recording Industry Association of America (RIAA).

A second volume, Precious Memories Volume II, was released on March 26, 2013.

Track listing 
All tracks Traditional except where noted.
"Blessed Assurance" – 1:56 (Phoebe P. Knapp, Fanny J. Crosby)
"Softly and Tenderly" – 3:17 (Will L. Thompson)
"I Love to Tell the Story" – 2:53 (William G. Fischer, Katherine Hankey)
"When We All Get to Heaven" (Eliza E. Hewitt) – 1:44
"'Tis So Sweet to Trust in Jesus" (Louisa M. R. Stead) – 1:52
"In the Garden" (Charles Austin Miles) – 2:54
"Are You Washed in the Blood?" (Elisha Hoffman)– 1:15
"I'll Fly Away" (Albert E. Brumley) – 2:13
"What a Friend We Have in Jesus" (Charles Converse, Joseph Scriven) – 2:16
"Standing on the Promises" (Russell Kelso Carter) – 1:35
"Turn Your Eyes Upon Jesus" (Helen H. Lemmel) – 3:47
"Leaning on the Everlasting Arms" (Anthony J. Showalter, Elisha A. Hoffman)– 1:34
"The Old Rugged Cross" (George Bennard) – 3:06
"How Great Thou Art" (Stuart Hine) – 3:32
"I Want to Stroll Over Heaven with You" (Dale Dodson) – 3:06

Personnel 
As listed in liner notes.
Alan Jackson – vocals, acoustic guitar
Melodie Crittenden – backing vocals
 Ali Jackson – backing vocals on "'Tis So Sweet to Trust in Jesus"
 Dani Jackson – assistant backing vocals on "'Tis So Sweet to Trust in Jesus"
 Denise Jackson – backing vocals on "'Tis So Sweet to Trust in Jesus"
 Mattie Jackson – backing vocals on "'Tis So Sweet to Trust in Jesus"
Brent Mason – acoustic guitar
Gary Prim – piano, organ
John Wesley Ryles – backing vocals
Keith Stegall – piano on "Turn Your Eyes Upon Jesus"

Chart performance 
Precious Memories debuted  at No. 4 on the U.S. Billboard 200, and No. 1 on the Top Country Albums, becoming his eighth #1 country album. In August 2006, Precious Memories was certified Platinum by the RIAA.  It has sold 389,600 copies in the United States as of November 2017.

Charts

Weekly charts

Year-end charts

Sales and certifications

Awards 
In 2007, the album won a Dove Award for Country Album of the Year at the 38th GMA Dove Awards.

References

External links 
 

2006 albums
Arista Records albums
Gospel albums by American artists
Alan Jackson albums
Albums produced by Keith Stegall